Marty's Tranquility Base  is a privately owned, public-use seaplane base located two nautical miles (4 km) southwest of the central business district of Prior Lake, a city in Scott County, Minnesota, United States.

Facilities and aircraft 
It has one landing area designated 8W/26W which measures 8,100 by 300 feet (2,469 x 91 m).

References

External links 
 

Airports in Minnesota
Seaplane bases in the United States
Buildings and structures in Scott County, Minnesota
Transportation in Scott County, Minnesota